General elections were held in Japan on 15 May 1912. The result was a victory for the Rikken Seiyūkai party, which won 209 of the 381 seats.

Electoral system
The 381 members of the House of Representatives were elected in 51 multi-member constituencies based on prefectures and cities. Voting was restricted to men aged over 25 who paid at least 10 yen a year in direct taxation. 1912 was also the first year citizens in Okinawa could vote.

Results

Notes

References

General elections in Japan
Japan
1912 elections in Japan
Japan
Election and referendum articles with incomplete results